Alireza Mansourian (born 2 December 1971) is an Iranian football coach and retired player.

Club career
Mansourian was born in Tehran. During his career, he played for Singapore S.League clubs: Balestier Khalsa FC and Geylang United along with the Iranian club Esteghlal F.C. He moved to Greek club Skoda Xanthi in 1998 after Xanthi fans contributed to raise the amount of money needed to complete the transfer. He played for Skoda Xanthi for one and a half seasons, taking part in 23 games. In December 1999, Mansourian went to Greek club Apollon Smyrnis for six months where he played seven games and scored once. After Apollon's relegation, he continued his career in Germany with FC St. Pauli where he remained for two seasons. Finally he returned to Iran and Esteghlal where he was appointed as the team's captain. Mansourian said farewell to professional football at the end of the 2007–08 season in which Esteghlal became Hazfi Cup champions.

International career
Mansourian made 46 appearances for the Iran national team and scored eight goals. He also participated in the 1998 FIFA World Cup.

Coaching career

Early years
He was head coach of Pas for four months in 2009. In August 2010, Afshin Ghotbi chose Mansourian as his assistant coach for the Iran national football team. After resignation of Ghotbi as head coach of national team, Mansourian was named as interim head coach until the appointment of Carlos Queiroz. He also coached Iran in a 1–0 win against Russia.

Iran U-23
On 28 April 2011, he became head coach of the Iranian national under-23 football team. On 2 January 2014, Mansourian resigned as head coach of Iran's under-23 side. He was replaced with Nelo Vingada.

Naft Tehran
He became manager of Iran Pro League club Naft Tehran on 31 May 2014. He led Naft Tehran to the third position and final game of Hazfi Cup in his first season at the club. They lost Hazfi Cup final to Zob Ahan. Mansourian's team also showed a good performance at AFC Champions League. Naft Tehran qualified from group stage after finishing second in their group. They also defeated Saudi Arabia's Al-Ahli in Round of 16 by away goals rule. However, they lost to Al-Ahli Dubai in Quarter-finals. At the end of the season, Esteghlal offered Mansourian to take the charge of their team after sacking of Amir Ghalenoei. The negotiations broken after Naft Tehran refused to release Mansourian. Mansourian signed a contract extension on 19 August 2015 for next two years. Naft Tehran began the season with selling of some of their squad stars, like Kamal Kamyabinia to Persepolis, Hossein Ebrahimi to Foolad and Leandro Padovani to Sepahan. Unless Naft facing financial problems during the season, Mansourian finished the season with Naft in fifth position. After the end of the season, Mansourian officially resigned and left the club.

He received offers from English team Brighton & Hove Albion in late 2015, but he turned it down to take over his former club Esteghlal Tehran. There was a tremendous pressure from the fans to bring him back to Esteghlal Tehran.

Esteghlal
On 1 June 2016, Mansourian was named as head coach of Esteghlal, signed a three-year contract with the club.

On 20 September 2017, he resigned from his role having managed the team for 16 months. Following his resignation, his assistant coach Mick McDermott took the job as caretaker manager.

Zob Ahan
On 15 November 2018, Mansourian became head coach of Zob Ahan, replacing Omid Namazi.

On 18 December 2019, Mansourian stepped down as Zob Ahan football club's coach by mutual consent.

Career statistics

Club

International
Scores and results list Iran's goal tally first, score column indicates score after each Mansourian goal.

Managerial statistics

Honours

Player
Esteghlal
 Iranian Football League (2): 1997–98, 2005–06, Runners-up 2003–04
 Hazfi Cup (2): 1995–96, 2007–08, Runners-up 2003–04
 AFC Champions League : Runners-Up 1998–99
Iran

1998 Asian Games Football:Goald medal

Manager
Naft Tehran
 Hazfi Cup runner-up: 2014–15

Esteghlal
 Persian Gulf Pro League runner-up: 2016–17

Individual
IFCA Manager of the Month: March 2015

References

External links

1971 births
Living people
1996 AFC Asian Cup players
1998 FIFA World Cup players
Apollon Smyrnis F.C. players
Esteghlal F.C. players
Expatriate footballers in Germany
Expatriate footballers in Greece
FC St. Pauli players
Association football midfielders
Iran international footballers
Iranian expatriate footballers
Iranian footballers
Xanthi F.C. players
Singapore Premier League players
Bundesliga players
2. Bundesliga players
Balestier Khalsa FC players
Asian Games gold medalists for Iran
Expatriate footballers in Singapore
Geylang International FC players
Asian Games medalists in football
Footballers at the 1998 Asian Games
Medalists at the 1998 Asian Games
Esteghlal F.C. managers
Zob Ahan Esfahan F.C. managers
Tractor S.C. managers
Sanat Naft Abadan F.C. managers
Iranian football managers
Iranian expatriate sportspeople in Germany
Iranian expatriate sportspeople in Greece
Persian Gulf Pro League managers